De Coelesti Hierarchia ("On the Celestial Hierarchy") is a Pseudo-Dionysian work on angelology, written in Greek and dated to ca. AD the 5th century; it exerted great influence on scholasticism and treats at great length the hierarchies of angels.

In Catholicism 
Thomas Aquinas (Summa Theologica, I.108) follows the Hierarchia (6.7) in dividing the angels into three hierarchies each of which contains three orders, based on their proximity to God, corresponding to the nine orders of angels recognized by Pope Gregory I.

 Seraphim, Cherubim, and Thrones;
 Dominations, Virtues, and Powers;
 Principalities, Archangels, and Angels.

Editions
 Pseudo-Dionysius Areopagita, De Coelesti Hierarchia, Surrey, 1935. Shrine of Wisdom .
 G. Heil, A. M. Ritter, Pseudo-Dionysius Areopagita. De Coelesti Hierarchia, De Ecclesiastica Hierarchia, De Mystica Theologia, Epistulae (1991) .

See also
Orthodox St. Dionysus Institute in Paris
Christian angelic hierarchy
Gregory Palamas
Apophatic theology
Hesychasm
Seven archangels
Vladimir Lossky

External links
The Celestial Hierarchy – full text translated into English (1899)
The Celestial Hierarchy (original Ancient Greek text)

5th-century books
Angels in Christianity
Catholic theology and doctrine
Neoplatonic texts
5th-century Christian texts